Rollinson is a surname. Notable people with this surname are:

Adrian Rollinson (born 1965), British strongman competitor
Alan Rollinson (born 1943), British former racing driver from England
Bill Rollinson (1856–1938), Major League Baseball catcher
Charles Rollinson Lamb (1860–1942), American architect and sculptor
Christopher Rollinson, former New Zealand boxer
John K. Rollinson (1884–1948), American writer of western non-fiction
Neil Rollinson (born 1960), British poet
Tim Rollinson (musician) (born 1959), Australian jazz guitarist and composer
Trevor Rollinson (born 1947), Australian rules footballer
Samuel Rollinson (1827–1891) English architect